Artificial digestion is a laboratory technique that reduces food to protein, fat, carbohydrates, fiber,  minerals, vitamins, and non-nutrient compounds for analytical or research purposes. Digestive agents such as pepsin and hydrochloric acid are typically used to accomplish artificial digestion.

Meat inspection
Artificial digestion is used to detect the presence of encysted trichinella larvae in suspected muscle tissue. Prior to this method, a sample of muscle tissue was compressed to visually express the encysted parasite. Using artificial digestion, meat samples are dissolved by a digestive solution and the remains are examined for the presence of larvae.

Digestion research
Artificial stomach and small intestine models are used instead of laboratory animals or human test subjects. Various models, from static one-compartment to dynamic multicompartment, exist. These models are used to study food digestion and subsequent bioavailability.

References

See also
 Digestion

Parasitology